Karin Verguts (born 3 May 1961) is a Belgian sprinter. She competed in the women's 200 metres at the 1980 Summer Olympics.

References

External links
 

1961 births
Living people
Athletes (track and field) at the 1980 Summer Olympics
Belgian female sprinters
Olympic athletes of Belgium
Place of birth missing (living people)
Olympic female sprinters